= Giedra Gudauskienė =

Lithuanian composer, ethnomusicologist, and pedagogue

Giedra Gudauskienė (July 10, 1923, Kaunas – May 22, 2006, Los Angeles) was a Lithuanian woman composer, ethnomusicologist, and pedagogue.
